Fegley is a surname of German origin, being an Americanized form of several German and Swiss German surnames. Notable people with the surname include:

Clayton Fegley, American politician
Oakes Fegley (born 2004), American actor
Richard Fegley (1936-2001), American professional photographer
Winslow Fegley (born 2009), American child actor

See also
Fegley, Missouri, an unincorporated community in Missouri
Fegley Glacier, a tributary glacier in the Holland Range of Antarctica
Phegley
Vögele
Vogler (surname)